Graham Michael Taylor (born May 25, 1984) is an American former professional baseball pitcher who played for the Florida Marlins of Major League Baseball during the 2009 season.

Amateur career
Taylor attended Miami University of Ohio, and in 2003 and 2004 he played collegiate summer baseball with the Hyannis Mets of the Cape Cod Baseball League. Prior to this, Danny Phelps hit a home run off him in high school. He was selected by the Florida Marlins in the 10th round of the 2006 MLB Draft.  He was signed by scout Matt Anderson.

Professional career
From 2006 to 2008, Taylor had a 28-16 record with a 3.07 ERA in the Minors. In 2007 while pitching for the Greensboro Grasshoppers, Taylor was named Marlins Organizational Pitcher of the Year. He was also named Marlins Pitcher of the Month on 3 occasions, as well as being Named Pitcher of the Week often in the minors.

Taylor made his Major League debut on April 26, 2009 against the Philadelphia Phillies. He pitched 3.2 innings and gave up 4 earned runs on 4 hits, 6 walks, 1 hit batsman. He also struck out 2 batters. The Marlins lost 13-2. Taylor was credited with the loss.

References

External links

1984 births
Living people
Baseball players from Kentucky
Dixie Heights High School alumni
Florida Marlins players
Miami RedHawks baseball players
Major League Baseball pitchers
Jamestown Jammers players
Greensboro Grasshoppers players
Jupiter Hammerheads players
Carolina Mudcats players
Somerset Patriots players
Jacksonville Suns players
Hyannis Harbor Hawks players